Im Jae-hyuk (born 6 May 1994), also spelt Lim Jae-hyeok, is a South Korean part-time actor signed under Santa Claus Entertainment. He became well known for his portrayal of Yang Dae-su in South Korean Netflix series All of Us Are Dead.

Personal life and career
Born on 6 May 1994, Im Jae-hyuk graduated from the Korea National University of Arts in 2016. While working as an actor, Im took three part-time jobs – a construction worker, a delivery driver, and a courier – to sustain his income. During his acting career, he has acted in movies, musicals and TV dramas, including an undisclosed role in 2020 SBS's drama serial Alice.

Im later appeared in Netflix's Korean web-drama All of Us Are Dead in 2022. He portrayed Yang Dae-su, an obese yet good-hearted student of Hyosan High School who aspires to be a singer. As preparation for his role, Im gained weight of 32 kg and he later lost 25 kg of it after the show finished filming. Im's portrayal of the character's funny scenes and his singing voice gained an increasing amount of attention from the netizens, in addition to the show's rising popularity.

When he appeared as a guest in You Quiz on the Block (hosted by Yoo Jae-suk and Jo Se-ho), Im Jae-hyuk revealed that despite his increasing popularity and Instagram followers (which rose to about 787,000), he still continues to work in five part-time jobs to supplement his income, as he still need to afford his rent and living expenses. He also expressed that he wanted to be financially independent after finishing his military service, so he kept his parents in the dark about his struggles and pretended to be doing well; Im's mother reportedly shed tears as she found out through the newspapers her son's part-time job experiences and financial difficulties.

Im served in the Republic of Korea Marine Corps in 2013 when he failed college entrance exams.

Filmography

Television series

Web series

Awards and nominations

References

External links 
 
 
 

1994 births
Living people
21st-century South Korean actors
South Korean male television actors
South Korean male film actors
Republic of Korea Marine Corps personnel
Korea National University of Arts alumni